Olena Kolesnichenko (Ukrainian: Олена Колесніченко; born 3 June 1993 in Rivne) is a Ukrainian athlete specialising in the 400 metres hurdles.

Her personal best in the event is 55.48	seconds set in Lutsk in 2016.

International competitions

References

1993 births
Living people
Sportspeople from Rivne
Ukrainian female hurdlers
Athletes (track and field) at the 2010 Summer Youth Olympics
Athletes (track and field) at the 2016 Summer Olympics
Olympic athletes of Ukraine
Universiade medalists in athletics (track and field)
Universiade bronze medalists for Ukraine
Medalists at the 2017 Summer Universiade